Colm Honan (born 1954) is an Irish former hurler who played as a midfielder for the Clare senior team.

Honan joined the team during the 1974 championship and became a regular player until his retirement at the end of the 1984 championship.  During that time he won back-to-back National Hurling League winners' medals and an All-Star award. His son, Darach Honan, played for the Clare senior hurling team, before retiring in 2017.

At club level Honan had a lengthy career with Clonlara.

References

1954 births
Clonlara hurlers
Clare inter-county hurlers
Munster inter-provincial hurlers
Living people